A Gun in Each Hand is a 2012 Spanish comedy film directed by Cesc Gay.

Cast

Production 
A Gun in Each Hand is an Impossible Films production, with the participation of TVE, TVC, Canal+ and support from ICAA, and ICEC. The screenplay was penned by Gay alongside recurring co-scribe Tomas Aragay. Marta Esteban took over production duties whereas Andreu Rebés worked as cinematographer.

Release 
The film was selected for screening as the closing film of the 7th Rome Film Festival on 17 November 2012. Distributed by Filmax, it was theatrically released on 5 December 2012.

Reception 
Jonathan Holland of Variety deemed the film to be a "a witty, perceptive dissection of midlife masculine insecurities that’s all about dialogue and what some fine thesps can do with it".

Accolades 

|-
| align = "center" rowspan = "9" | 2013
| rowspan = "6" | 5th Gaudí Awards || colspan = "2" | Best Non-Catalan language Film ||  || rowspan = "6" | 
|-
| Best Director || Cesc Gay || 
|-
| Best Screenplay || Tomàs Aragay, Cesc Gay || 
|-
| Best Supporting Actress || Candela Peña || 
|-
| Best Supporting Actor || Eduard Fernández || 
|-
| Best Costume Design || Anna Güell || 
|-
| 27th Goya Awards || Best Supporting Actress || Candela Peña ||  || 
|-
| rowspan = "2" | 22nd Actors and Actresses Union Awards || Best Film Actress in a Secondary Role || Candela Peña ||  || rowspan = "2" | 
|-
| Best Film Actor in a Secondary Role || Eduard Fernández || 
|}

See also 
 List of Spanish films of 2012

References

External links 

2012 comedy films
Spanish comedy films
Films directed by Cesc Gay
2010s Spanish-language films
2010s Spanish films